The black-spotted casque-headed tree frog (Trachycephalus nigromaculatus) is a species of frog in the family Hylidae endemic to Brazil. Its natural habitats are subtropical or tropical moist lowland forests, subtropical or tropical moist shrubland, freshwater lakes, intermittent freshwater lakes, freshwater marshes, intermittent freshwater marshes, rural gardens, and heavily degraded former forests.
It is threatened by habitat loss.

References

Trachycephalus
Endemic fauna of Brazil
Amphibians described in 1838
Taxonomy articles created by Polbot